Classic Gaming Expo was a gaming convention dedicated to the people, systems and games of the past, with an emphasis on old video games. The Expo was founded in 1999 by John Hardie, Sean Kelly and Keita Iida, In 2000, Joe Santulli replaced Iida as the show's co-organizer.

The conventions have typically been held in the Las Vegas Valley, Nevada, but have sometimes been held in Silicon Valley.

In addition to the expo, Kelly, Hardie and Santulli founded the Videogame History Museum, a traveling museum of classic video games and equipment that is on display at events like E3 (Electronic Entertainment Expo) and GDC (Game Developers Conference). In April 2016, the traveling museum celebrated the building of a permanent facility known as the National Videogame Museum in Frisco, Texas. Currently, as of May 2020, Hardie is the resident curator.

History 
In October 1995, videogame collectors Hardie, Iida and Mike Etler, founded North Atlantic Videogame Aficionados (NAVA) at Video Game Connections, Etler's videogame store in Howell, New Jersey. The purpose of the quarterly event was to provide a meeting place where videogamers could meet and discuss videogame collecting as well as a place to buy, sell and trade games. The group was a hit and attracted collectors from all around the north east from Canada to South Carolina.

In 1998, Hardie and Iida decided to make NAVA national. They teamed up with Richard Tsukiji to include classic gaming memorabilia at Tsukiji's annual World of Atari show. The show was held in Las Vegas at the Holiday Inn Boardwalk Hotel and Casino on August 21–23, 1998. The event was such a success that Hardie and Iida decided to break away from World of Atari and, along with Sean Kelly, created their own show, Classic Gaming Expo.

Classic Gaming Expo has been held at the following dates and places:
 1999 – August 14–15 – Las Vegas – Plaza Hotel
 2000 – July 29–30 – Las Vegas – Plaza Hotel
 2001 – August 11–12 – Las Vegas – Plaza Hotel
 2002 – August 10–11 – Las Vegas – Plaza Hotel
 2003 – August 9–10 – Las Vegas – Plaza Hotel
 2004 – August 21–22 – San Jose – McEnery Convention Center
 2005 – August 20–21 – Burlingame, California – San Francisco Airport Hilton
 2007 – July 28–29 - Las Vegas - Riviera Hotel 
 2010 – July 31-August 1 – Las Vegas – Tropicana
 2012 – August 11–12 – Las Vegas – Plaza Hotel
 2014 – September 12–14 - Las Vegas - Riviera Hotel

References

External links 
 
 Classic Experience

Las Vegas Valley conventions and trade shows
Defunct gaming conventions
1999 establishments in Nevada